Dimetia is a genus of flowering plants in the family Rubiaceae. The genus is found from the Indian subcontinent to south-central China and west and central .

Species
Dimetia ampliflora 
Dimetia capitellata 
Dimetia dianxiensis 
Dimetia obliquinervis 
Dimetia pitardiana 
Dimetia scandens

References

Rubiaceae genera
Spermacoceae